Ernest Van Pelt (March 31, 1883 – July 1, 1961) was an American actor. Van Pelt often starred in Charlie Chaplin films.

Life
Ernest Van Pelt was born on 31 March 1883 in Kansas. Van Pelt died on July 1, 1961, in Los Angeles, California.

Partial filmography
The Tramp (1915)
The Champion (1915)
In the Park (1915)
By the Sea (1915)
A Jitney Elopement (1915)
 Montana Bill (1921) (actor and assistant director)
 Bring Him In (1921) (actor)
 The Cloud Rider (1925) (supervising producer)
 Avenging Fangs (1927) (director)
 Annapolis Farewell (1935)
 I Live for Love (1935) (stage director)
 Two Sinners'' (1935)

References

External links
 
 

1883 births
1961 deaths
American male film actors
American male silent film actors
Male actors from Kansas
20th-century American male actors